Amerizus is a genus of ground beetles in the family Carabidae. There are more than 50 described species in Amerizus.

Species
These 53 species belong to the genus Amerizus:

 Amerizus arunachalensis Deuve, 2006  (the Indian Subcontinent)
 Amerizus barkamensis Deuve, 1998  (China)
 Amerizus baxiensis Deuve, 1998  (China)
 Amerizus beatriciae Queinnec & Perreau, 2002  (the Indian Subcontinent)
 Amerizus bhutanensis (Morvan, 2004)  (the Indian Subcontinent)
 Amerizus bolivari (Andrewes, 1927)  (the Indian Subcontinent)
 Amerizus camillae Queinnec & Perreau, 2002  (the Indian Subcontinent)
 Amerizus casalei Perrault, 1985  (the Indian Subcontinent)
 Amerizus davidales Sciaky & Toledano, 2007  (China)
 Amerizus deuvei Perrault, 1985  (the Indian Subcontinent)
 Amerizus eremita (Queinnec, 1984)  (the Indian Subcontinent)
 Amerizus faizae Queinnec & Perreau, 2002  (the Indian Subcontinent)
 Amerizus farkaci Sciaky & Toledano, 2007  (China)
 Amerizus ganesh (Queinnec, 1984)  (the Indian Subcontinent)
 Amerizus gaoligongensis Gueorguiev, 2015  (China)
 Amerizus garuda Queinnec & Perreau, 2002  (the Indian Subcontinent)
 Amerizus gologensis Deuve, 2004  (China)
 Amerizus gongga Deuve, 1998  (China)
 Amerizus gosainkundensis (Habu, 1973)  (the Indian Subcontinent)
 Amerizus hubeiensis Deuve, 2002  (China)
 Amerizus indecorus Queinnec & Perreau, 2002  (the Indian Subcontinent)
 Amerizus kashmiricus (Jedlicka, 1938)  (the Indian Subcontinent)
 Amerizus lama Sciaky & Toledano, 2007  (China)
 Amerizus lassallei Perrault, 1985  (the Indian Subcontinent)
 Amerizus ledouxi Perrault, 1985  (the Indian Subcontinent)
 Amerizus loebli Marggi & Toledano, 2015  (the Indian Subcontinent)
 Amerizus macrocephalus Queinnec & Perreau, 2002  (the Indian Subcontinent)
 Amerizus maquensis Deuve, 2004  (China)
 Amerizus markamensis Deuve, 1998  (China)
 Amerizus martensi Queinnec & Perreau, 2002  (the Indian Subcontinent)
 Amerizus morvani Queinnec & Perreau, 2002  (the Indian Subcontinent)
 Amerizus mourzinei Deuve, 1998  (China)
 Amerizus oblonguloides (Lindroth, 1963)  (North America)
 Amerizus oblongulus (Mannerheim, 1852)  (North America)
 Amerizus panda Sciaky & Toledano, 2007  (China)
 Amerizus perraulti Deuve, 1998  (China)
 Amerizus puetzi Sciaky & Toledano, 2007  (China)
 Amerizus queinneci Deuve, 1998  (China)
 Amerizus sabinae Queinnec & Perreau, 2002  (the Indian Subcontinent)
 Amerizus sarkimani Queinnec & Perreau, 2002  (the Indian Subcontinent)
 Amerizus schawalleri Queinnec & Perreau, 2002  (the Indian Subcontinent)
 Amerizus schmidti Sciaky & Toledano, 2007  (China)
 Amerizus shatanicus Deuve, 2004  (China)
 Amerizus songpanensis Deuve, 1998  (China)
 Amerizus spectabilis (Mannerheim, 1852)  (North America)
 Amerizus teles Belousov & Dudko, 2010  (Russia)
 Amerizus tiani Deuve, 2004  (China)
 Amerizus turnai Deuve, 1998  (China)
 Amerizus utahensis (Van Dyke, 1926)  (North America)
 Amerizus wingatei (Bland, 1864)  (Europe & Northern Asia (excluding China) and North America)
 Amerizus wittmeri Queinnec & Perreau, 2002  (the Indian Subcontinent)
 Amerizus wolongensis Deuve, 2002  (China)
 Amerizus wrzecionkoi Deuve, 1998  (China)

References

External links

 

Trechinae